David Lozano Riba (born 21 December 1988) is a Spanish professional racing cyclist, who currently rides for UCI ProTeam .

Major results

Cyclo-cross

2005–2006
 1st  Junior National Championships
2006–2007
 1st  Under–23 National Championships
2007–2008
 1st  Under–23 National Championships
2008–2009
 1st  Under–23 National Championships
2009–2010
 1st  Under–23 National Championships
2013–2014
 1st Sant Joan Despí
 1st Torroella de Montgrí
 1st Sant Celoni
 1st Reus

Mountain biking
2007
 1st  Under–23 National Cross-country Championships
2009
 1st  Under–23 National Cross-country Championships
2010
 1st  Under–23 National Cross-country Championships

Road
2018
 5th Overall Tour of Rwanda
1st Stage 7 
 5th Overall Tour of Estonia
2019
 6th Overall Tour of Rwanda
 8th Overall Tour of Taiyuan
1st  Mountains classification
2022
 10th Overall South Aegean Tour

References

External links
 

1988 births
Living people
Spanish male cyclists
Sportspeople from Terrassa
Cyclists from Catalonia
People with type 1 diabetes
21st-century Spanish people